Domboshava is a peri-urban residential area in the province of Mashonaland East, Zimbabwe. The name is derived from Dombo meaning rock and Shava translating to light brown. The clan name Shava is a reference to the light brown colour of the Eland or Mhofu in Shona.

The most prominent and famous granite hill in Domboshava is called Ngoma Kurira which directly translates to the drum sounds/drumming!!!!. This site attracts hundreds of both local and international travelers each year. The granite hill is a National Monument of Zimbabwe and has some examples of cave paintings which date back almost 6000 years.  The majority of these paintings can be found in a cave which is some walk from the rock formations at the top of the hill.  
There is also a hole in the cave that leads to the top hill.

The three largest shopping centers (commonly known as grocery points in Zimbabwe) are Mverechena, Mkate and Showground. These centers have become areas of large economic activity and growth for Domboshava. For many years, primarily in the later 20th-century, Domboshawa was a major location of truck gardening for the markets of Harare. Since the start of the 21st-century of so Domboshava's economy has seen a rise in pottery production and horticulture.

References

Populated places in Mashonaland Central Province